Ravesteyn may refer to
 Josse Ravesteyn, Flemish Roman Catholic theologian
 Jan Antonisz van Ravesteyn, Dutch Golden Age portrait painter
 Anthonie van Ravesteyn, Dutch Golden Age portrait painter, brother of the former
 Arnold van Ravesteyn, Dutch Golden Age portrait painter, son of the former
 Hubert van Ravesteyn, Dutch Golden Age painter
 Nicolaes van Ravesteyn, 18th century painter from the Northern Netherlands
 Sybold van Ravesteyn (1889-1983), Dutch architect
 Willem van Ravesteyn (1876-1970), Dutch Communist politician and historian